Eugène François Charles Joseph Lamoral de Ligne d'Amblise et d'Epinoy (Brussels, 28 January 1804 – Brussels, 20 May 1880), 8th Prince of Ligne and of the Holy Roman Empire was a Belgian diplomat and liberal politician.

Family
He was the son of Louis Eugene Marie Lamoral, Prince of Ligne and Countess Louise van der Noot de Duras.
He married 3 times; through his daughter Princess Natalie of Ligne, he was the grandfather of Princess Isabella of Croÿ. One of his sons, Edouard, married Princess Eulalia, daughter of Prince Carl of Solms-Braunfels.

Career
He lived in Vienna from 1834 until 1837. After his return to Belgium, he was named ambassador and sent to London for the coronation of Queen Victoria. He had a successful diplomatic career. In 1849 he was elected as a member of the Belgian parliament and was President of the Belgian Senate, in succession of Augustin Dumon-Dumortier, from 25 March 1852 until 18 July 1879. In 1863 the King named him Minister of State.

He died in Brussels and was buried in Belœil, near Château de Belœil, the estate of the House of Ligne.

Honours 
 National
 : Grand Cordon in the Order of Leopold, 16 June 1838
 Foreign
 :
 Knight of the Order of Saint Hubert
 Knight Grand Cross in the Order of Saint Michael
 : Knight Grand Cross in the Legion of Honour, 22 August 1846
  Holy See: Knight, 1st Class in the Order of Pope Pius IX
 : Knight of the Order of Saint John of Jerusalem
 : Knight of the Order of the Black Eagle
 : Knight Grand Cross in the Saxe-Ernestine House Order
 :
 Grandee of Spain, 1st Class
 Knight of the Golden Fleece
  Two Sicilian Royal Family: Knight Grand Cross in the Order of Saint Januarius

See also
Liberal Party
Liberalism in Belgium

References

Sources 

 in Belgium

|-

1804 births
1880 deaths
Diplomats from Brussels
Belgian Ministers of State
Presidents of the Senate (Belgium)
08
Grand Croix of the Légion d'honneur
Grandees of Spain
Knights of the Golden Fleece of Spain
Nobility from Brussels